Mary Lucinda Cardwell Dawson (1894-1962) was an American musician and teacher and the founding director of the National Negro Opera Company (NNOC).

Biography
Dawson née Cardwell was born in 1894 in Madison, North Carolina. She studied music at the New England Conservatory of Music in Boston graduating in 1925. She continued her studies at the Chicago Musical College. In the late 1920s, she married Walter Dawson, a master electrician, and they moved to Pittsburgh, Pennsylvania.

In 1927, Dawson opened the Cardwell Dawson School of Music in the Homewood neighborhood of Pittsburgh, which remained open until 1941. Dawson also organized the Cardwell Dawson Choir.

After presenting the opera Aida at the National Association of Negro Musicians convention of 1941, Dawson launched her National Negro Opera Company (NNOC) later that same year with a performance at Pittsburgh's Syria Mosque. The star was La Julia Rhea, and other members included Minto Cato, Carol Brice, Robert McFerrin, and Lillian Evanti. NNOC mounted productions in Washington D.C., New York City, Chicago, and Pittsburgh.

Dawson was devoted to bringing opera to African American audiences. She organized opera guilds in Baltimore, Chicago, Cleveland, Detroit, Washington, D.C., Newark, and New York. She trained hundreds of African American youth to sing opera.

In 1961, Dawson was appointed to the National Music Committee by President John F. Kennedy.

Dawson died in 1962.

The Passion of Mary Cardwell Dawson 
The Passion of Mary Cardwell Dawson is a play that was commissioned and premiered at the Glimmerglass Festival in Cooperstown, New York in 2021.  The play and text for music were written by Sandra Seaton with original music by Carlos Simon.  The play tells the story of her founding of the National Negro Opera Company.  Total run time is 70 minutes.

Further reading
National Negro Opera Company Programs and Promotional Materials: Henry P. Whitehead Collection
National Negro Opera Company collection, Music Division, Library of Congress.

References

1894 births
1962 deaths
20th-century African-American women singers
20th-century American women opera singers
African-American women opera singers
American women music educators
American opera directors
Classical musicians from Pennsylvania
Educators from Pennsylvania
Musicians from Pittsburgh
New England Conservatory alumni
Singers from Pennsylvania
Voice teachers